" is Rurutia's fourth and last original album under Toshiba-EMI and was released April 13, 2005.

Track listing 
 Dancing Meme - 1:05
 Tone - 4:22
 Lila ga Chittemo (リラが散っても Even if the lilacs die) - 3:39
 Primary (プライマリー) - 5:31
 Signal (シグナル) - 4:17
 Scarlet (スカーレット) - 4:43
 Selenite (セレナイト) - 5:33
 Heath no Rakuen (ヒースの楽園 The heath's paradise) - 3:48
 Aoi Bara (青い薔薇 Blue roses) - 3:41
 Chou no Mori (蝶ノ森 Butterfly's forest) - 4:53
 Cobalt no Hoshi (コバルトの星 Cobalt stars) - 4:41
 Sleeping Meme - 3:39

References 

2005 albums
Rurutia albums